Tent is an album recorded by the Nits. It was released in the year 1979 by Columbia Records.

Track listing
All tracks written by Henk Hofstede (HH) and Michiel Peters (MP).

Vinyl release

Side A
Tent – 2:07 (HH)
A to B; C to D – 3:01 (MP)
The Young Reporter – 2:42 (HH)
4 Ankles – 2:27 (MP/HH)
Hook of Holland – 2:48 (HH)
Frozen Fred – 2:25 (MP)
Ping Pong – 2:33 (HH)

Side B
Tutti Ragazzi – 2:13 (HH)
Out of Suburbia – 2:38 (MP)
Bungalow – 2:42 (HH)
1:30 – 3:08 (MP)
Johnny Said Silver – 2:46 (HH)
Who's the Killer – 2:29 (HH)
Take a Piece – 2:05 (HH)
Tent (Reprise) – 1:03 (HH)

CD release
Tent – 2:07 (HH)
A to B; C to D – 3:01 (MP)
The Young Reporter – 2:42 (HH)
4 Ankles – 2:27 (MP/HH)
Hook of Holland – 2:48 (HH)
Frozen Fred – 2:25 (MP)
Ping Pong – 2:33 (HH)
Tutti Ragazzi – 2:13 (HH)
Out of Suburbia – 2:38 (MP)
Bungalow – 2:42 (HH)
1:30 – 3:08 (MP)
Johnny Said Silver – 2:46 (HH)
Who's the Killer – 2:29 (HH)
Take a Piece – 2:05 (HH)
Tent (Reprise) – 1:03 (HH)
Umbrella – 3:10 (HH)
Some Other Night – 2:39 (MP)
Harrow Accident – 3:02 (MP)

Personnel

The band
 Henk Hofstede – keyboards, vocals
 Rob Kloet – drums, backing vocals
 Alex Roelofs – bass, backing vocals
 Michiel Peters – guitar, vocals
 Paul Telman – engineer
 Hans Schot – transportation

Additional musicians
 The Tapes – backing vocals (track 12)

Technical staff
 The Nits – producers (except tracks 3 & 8)
 Aad Link – producer (except tracks 3 & 8)
 Robert Jan Stips – producer (tracks 3 & 8)
 Aad Link – engineer (Artisound)
 Eric van Tijn – engineer (Artisound)
 Robin Freeman – engineer (Relight)
 John Sonneveld – engineer (DMC Baarn)

Miscellaneous
 John Prins – photography (Fotografie BV)
 The Nits – design & lay-out

References

1979 albums
Nits (band) albums
Columbia Records albums